The bleeding heart tetra, Hyphessobrycon erythrostigma, is a freshwater tropical fish native to the Upper Amazon River basin.  It grows to the size of 64mm and lives for around five years.

Sexing 

The female is more full bodied and the male has a larger dorsal fin, whereas the male is distinguished by longer extended dorsal and anal fins. The dorsal fin is elongated into a sickle shape that arches to the length of the tail base. The female has a shorter rounded fin.

Breeding in captivity 

This egg-laying fish has been bred successfully, with difficulty, in captivity.

Appearance 

The dorsal fin of the males can become long and flowing. Both sexes have the eye-catching blood-red spot in the pectoral area. Both also have the black and white patch on the dorsal fin.

Aquarium care 

A group of 6 fishes will feel comfortable in a 15-gallon tank, but a bigger tank (preferably 30 gallons) and more fishes are  recommended.

See also
List of freshwater aquarium fish species

References 

Tetras
Fish described in 1943
Taxa named by Henry Weed Fowler